Geltsdale & Glendue Fells is a Site of Special Scientific Interest in the North Pennines, England.  The site has an area of 8059 ha, partly in Cumbria and partly in Northumberland.

Birdlife 
It is noted for its ornithological interest and the greater part of the area is managed as a RSPB reserve for upland birds. It is one of a group of SSSIs underlying the North Pennines Moors Special Protection Area, which was designated in 2001 under the Birds Directive.

See also
 Geltsdale RSPB reserve

References

Sites of Special Scientific Interest in Cumbria
Sites of Special Scientific Interest in Northumberland